Broadway is a locality in the Upper Lachlan Shire, New South Wales, Australia. It lies about 10 km to the west of Dalton and 34 km northeast of Yass.

References

Upper Lachlan Shire
Localities in New South Wales
Southern Tablelands